The Red Web: The Struggle Between Russia's Digital Dictators and the New Online Revolutionaries (2015) is a non-fiction English-language book by Russian journalists Andrei Soldatov and Irina Borogan which examines the history of surveillance technologies in Russia from the beginnings of the internet to the Internet age.

Content 
The book documents what the authors deem the "monumental battle for the future of the Internet." It examines the history of surveillance technologies in Russia, the Soviet Union's authoritarian control over information and its distribution, and the legacy of this mindset as it reverberates in the Russia in the Internet age. The authors also chart the history of the Russian search and surveillance system SORM (Sistema Operativno-Rozysknikh Meropriyatiy, or System of Operative Search Measures). SORM has been giving the FSB a back door to spy on internet communications since 1998.

Excerpts from the book were published by The Guardian, Buzzfeed, Business Insider, Foreign Policy, Motherboard, The Daily Beast, and Slate.

Reception 
Buzzfeed ran an excerpt from The Red Web on September 2, 2015, with the headline "How Edward Snowden Inadvertently Helped Vladimir Putin's Internet Crackdown." Three days later, on September 5, Edward Snowden was accepting the Norwegian Academy of Literature and Freedom of Expression's Bjornson prize – which he was awarded for his work on the right to privacy – by videophone from Russia. The host of the ceremony, Per Anders Johansen, Moscow correspondent for Afternposten, confronted Snowden with a quote from the Red Web's extract in Buzzfeed, asking to comment on the situation with the Internet freedoms in Russia. Snowden described the country's restrictions on the web as a "mistake in policy". He said: "It's wrong in Russia, and it would be wrong anywhere. "I've been quite critical of [it] in the past and I'll continue to be in the future, because this drive that we see in the Russian government to control more and more the internet, to control more and more what people are seeing, even parts of personal lives, deciding what is the appropriate or inappropriate way for people to express their love for one another ... [is] fundamentally wrong."

The Red Web was named A Library Journal Best Book of 2015 and NPR's Best Book of 2015.

See also
Computer Russification
History of computing in the Soviet Union
Information technology in Russia

References

American history books
Books about the Internet
Books about Russia
Books about the Cold War
2015 non-fiction books
PublicAffairs books